Darryl Lee Jones is a former Major League Baseball designated hitter. He was born on June 5, 1951 in Meadville, Pennsylvania. Jones is the brother of former Major League Baseball player Lynn Jones. Darryl attended college at Westminster College and was drafted by the New York Yankees in the 5th round of the 1972 draft. He had 12 career hits in 47 at bats.

External links

1951 births
Living people
Westminster Titans baseball players
Major League Baseball designated hitters
New York Yankees players
Baseball players from Pennsylvania
Columbus Clippers players
Fort Lauderdale Yankees players
Oneonta Yankees players
Syracuse Chiefs players
Tacoma Yankees players
West Haven Yankees players
African-American baseball players